Navajo Lake is a reservoir located in San Juan County and Rio Arriba County in northwestern New Mexico, in the southwestern United States. Portions of the reservoir extend into Archuleta County in southern Colorado. The lake is part of the Colorado River Storage Project, which here manages the upper reaches of the San Juan River, storing and releasing water that is used locally for irrigation, or ultimately reaching the Colorado River in Utah.

The construction of the dam and the resulting lake flooded and destroyed one of the Navajos' most sacred sites.

The Lake and associated shoreline areas near the dam in New Mexico and the river shorelines below the dam are part of New Mexico's Navajo Lake State Park, while the Portion of the shoreline and portion of the lake that is located in Colorado make up Navajo State Park which is managed as part of the Colorado State Parks system.  The lake has smallmouth bass, black crappie, northern pike, channel catfish, and trout. The waters of Navajo Lake forced hundreds of families to leave their homes and communities. The four communities affected were Los Arboles, Los Pinos, Rose and Los Martinez. The 1.7 million acre-foot reservoir displaced an unknown amount of farms and ranches. It has been estimated that almost 200 mainly Hispanic families had to move. Some families had been here nearly 80–90 years.

See also
List of largest reservoirs of Colorado

References

External links
 Navajo Lake State Park

Buildings and structures in Archuleta County, Colorado
Buildings and structures in Rio Arriba County, New Mexico
Buildings and structures in San Juan County, New Mexico
Bodies of water of Archuleta County, Colorado
Bodies of water of San Juan County, New Mexico
Colorado River Storage Project
Lakes of Rio Arriba County, New Mexico
Parks in Archuleta County, Colorado
Parks in Rio Arriba County, New Mexico
Parks in San Juan County, New Mexico
Reservoirs in Colorado
Reservoirs in New Mexico
State parks of New Mexico
1962 establishments in New Mexico